Ludlow-Van Rensselaer House is a historic home located at Claverack in Columbia County, New York, next to the William Henry Ludlow House.  It was built about 1784 and is a 2-story, five-by-one-bay center entrance, brick dwelling with a gable roof.  It has a 2-story gable-roofed rear wing.  The entry features a finely crafted portico composed of Ionic order columns supporting a wide entablature and shallow pitched roof.

It was added to the National Register of Historic Places in 1997.

References

External links

Houses on the National Register of Historic Places in New York (state)
Federal architecture in New York (state)
Houses completed in 1784
Houses in Columbia County, New York
National Register of Historic Places in Columbia County, New York